Polydictya is a genus of planthoppers in the sub-family Poiocerinae Haupt, 1929. Species are distributed from India, through Indo-China, to Malesia.

Species
Fulgoromorpha Lists on the Web lists:
 Polydictya bantimurung Constant, 2015
 Polydictya barclayi Constant, 2016
 Polydictya basalis (Hope, 1843) - type species
 Polydictya basirubra Constant, 2015
 Polydictya chantrainei Nagai & Porion, 2004
 Polydictya chewi Nagai & Porion, 2004
 Polydictya crassa Distant, 1906
 Polydictya draysapensis Constant & Pham, 2019
 Polydictya drumonti Constant & Pham, 2017
 Polydictya duffelsi Constant, 2009
 Polydictya grootaerti Constant & Pham, 2017
 Polydictya illuminata Distant, 1906
 Polydictya jakli Constant, 2016
 Polydictya johannae Lallemand, 1956
 Polydictya katsurakoae Nagai & Porion, 1996
 Polydictya khmera Constant & Pham, 2019
 Polydictya kuntzi Nagai & Porion, 2004
 Polydictya laotiana Constant & Pham, 2019
 Polydictya lombokana Constant, 2010
 Polydictya nami Constant & Pham, 2019
 Polydictya negrito Distant, 1906
 Polydictya nigrifrons Constant & Pham, 2019
 Polydictya ornata Chew Kea Foo, Porion & Audibert, 2010
 Polydictya pantherina Gerstaecker, 1895
 Polydictya pelengana Constant, 2015
 Polydictya robusta Gerstaecker, 1895
 Polydictya rufifrons Schmidt, 1910
 Polydictya sumatrana Schmidt, 1910
 Polydictya tanjiewhoei Bosuang, Audibert & Porion, 2015
 Polydictya thanatos Chew Kea Foo, Porion & Audibert, 2010
 Polydictya thompsoni Constant & Pham, 2019
 Polydictya tricolor (Westwood, 1845)
 Polydictya triumphalis Bosuang, Audibert & Porion, 2015
 Polydictya uniformis (Walker, 1857)
 Polydictya vietnamica Constant & Pham, 2008

References

External links

Auchenorrhyncha genera
Poiocerinae